is a Japanese actor and singer. Shibata made his television debut in 1977 with "Daitokai Part II as a guest. In 1978, Shibata made his first regular appearance in the police drama Daitsuiseki. Following year, he played a leading role for the first time in TV drama series Akai Arashi on TBS. In 1980, he won his first major award at the Elan d'or Awards for his role in Oretachi wa Tenshi da! . Shibata won great popularity through his role in Abunai Deka series.

Filmography

Television
Daitokai PartII (1977) (Guest ep.15)
Taiyō ni Hoero! (1978), Tetsuo Tanimura (Guest ep.284)
Daitsuiseki (1978), Detective Minoru Takimoto
Akai Arashi (1979)
Oretachi wa Tenshi da! (1979) 
Aoi Zesshō (1980–81), Tetsuo Suzuki
Omoide Zukuri (1981), Norio Nemoto
Pro Hunter (1981), Goto
Sanga Moyu (1984)
Abunai Deka (1986–87), Yūji Ōshita
Motto Abunai Deka (1988–89), Yūji Ōshita
Takeda Shingen (1988), Uesugi Kenshin
Hagetaka (2007), Takeo Shibano
Gunshi Kanbei (2014), Kuroda Mototaka
The Hippocratic Oath (2016), Tōjirō Mitsuzaki
Bones of Steel (2020), Manzō Mitsuhashi

Film
Chi-n-pi-ra (1984), Yōichi
Abunai Deka (1987), Yūji Ōshita
Mata Mata Abunai Deka (1988), Yūji Ōshita
Mottomo Abunai Deka (1989), Yūji Ōshita
Fukuzawa Yukichi (1991), Fukuzawa Yukichi
Bloom in the Moonlight (1993), Kōda Rohan
Abunai Deka Returns (1996), Yūji Ōshita
Abunai Deka Forever: The Movie (1998), Yūji Ōshita
69 (2004), Ken's father
Half a Confession (2004), Detective Kazumasa Shiki
Mada Mada Abunai Deka (2005), Yūji Ōshita
Hagetaka: The Movie (2009), Takeo Shibano
Saraba Abunai Deka (2016), Yūji Ōshita
The Confidence Man JP: Episode of the Princess (2020)

Dubbing

Live-action
Mad Max 2 (1984 Fuji TV edition), "Mad" Max Rockatansky (Mel Gibson)
The Sting, Johnny "Kelly" Hooker (Robert Redford)

Animation
Balto, Balto

Awards

References

External links
 

1951 births
Japanese male voice actors
Japanese male singers
Living people
Musicians from Shizuoka Prefecture
Male voice actors from Shizuoka Prefecture
Nihon University alumni